Gerik (Jawi: ڬريق;  ; Tamil: கிரிக் ; alternate spelling: Grik) is a mukim and the district capital of Hulu Perak District, Perak, Malaysia. The town is also known as Rest Town owing to its strategic location next to East-West Highway Federal Route 4, the main route linking Kedah, Penang and Kelantan.

History 
From the historical records, the first person to enter Gerik was Tun Saban, the son of Tun Perak, and the treasurer of the Malacca Sultanate in the early 16th century. During the fall of the Malacca government into the hands of the Portuguese, Tun Saban migrated to Hulu Patani and then moved to Belum, Gerik. He became the chairman of the community at Belum.

Gerik is bordered by Reman State to the north. Raja Reman trespassed into Gerik and captured Klian Intan and Kroh (Pengkalan Hulu). By the 19th century, most of Gerik's territory was conquered by King Reman. In 1902, the monarchy in Reman was abolished by the Siamese government and the Gerik region was incorporated as a colony.

On 9 July 1902, the Siamese government entered into an agreement with the British government to hand over Kedah, Perlis, Kelantan and Terengganu to British rule. The agreement was signed in Bangkok by Sir John Anderson (Straits Settlements) and the Siam Foreign Secretary. Among the conditions in the agreement, the Siamese government also had to hand over the Gerik district which had been taken by Raja Reman to the Perak government. The ceremony of handing over the Gerik area was held in Kroh on 16 July 1909.

Notable landmarks
District and Land Office
Malaysian Public Works Department (JKR) district offices
District mosque
Bus Station
Klinik Kesihatan Plang

Food
Restoran Kak Nik Plang: A famous Malay restaurant on the main road of Kampung Plang, Gerik, beside SK Plang and Mosque, before reaching the town of Gerik
Restoran Limra: (Mamak special)-A Mamak restaurant on the main road of Gerik, at the middle of the row, before reaching Bangunan Persekutuan Gerik (The Federal Building)
Restoran Riz: A Malay cuisine restaurant owned by an Akademi Fantasia artiste named Riz
Restoran Nasi Lemak Ayam Godam: Fresh Nasi Lemak with chicken in its own peculiar cooking style
Chau Y Restaurant: Serving Chinese cuisine, including freshwater fish, wild boar meat, and anchovies with cashew nuts. Opens for lunch and dinner. On the main road of Gerik.
113 Restaurant: A Chinese restaurant on the main road of Gerik, at the end of the same row with Chau Y
Kentucky Fried Chicken (KFC)
Salim Kari Kepala Ikan
Gerai Che Mah Batu 3: Malay cuisine
Pizza Hut: Delivery
Gemilang Cake House: Bakery
Rumah Makan 33300 Kampung Air Suda
Chop Roti Canai Kampung Air Suda

School and education
MRSM Gerik
SK Mahkota Sari
SK Sri Adika Raja
SK Plang
SK Batu 4
SJK(T) Gerik
SMK Gerik
SMK Sultan Idris Shah II
SMK Seri Budiman
SMK Kenering
Kolej Komuniti Gerik
SMK Batu 4,Jalan Kuala Rui
SJK(C) Chung Wa
SJK(C) Batu 2
SJK(C) Kuala Rui
Kolej Vokasional Gerik
SK Pahit
SK Kerunai
SK Budiman
SK Tan Sri Ghazali Jawi
Sk Ganda Temengor

Fishing and camping
Belum Rainforest Resort
Air Beruk (Camping Site)
Homestay Eco Resort Kampung Plang
Tasik Banding
Tasik Temenggor (Temenggor Lake)
Tasik Bersia Lama
Gerik Illo

Transportation
Gerik is located right next to the intersection of highways 4 and 76. Highway Federal Route 4 is the main route preferred by Penang and Kedah motorists to access the east coast states of Kelantan and Terengganu. Highway Federal Route 76 links Gerik to Pengkalan Hulu (right next to the border with Thailand) and then Baling in Kedah due north, and to Kuala Kangsar, the royal seat of Perak in the south.

Politics
Gerik is currently represented in the Dewan Rakyat of the Malaysian Parliament by Dato' Hasbullah bin Osman of UMNO, part of the Barisan Nasional coalition.

The constituency also supplies two seats to the Perak State Legislative Assembly, namely:
 Pengkalan Hulu; and
 Temenggor.

Both seats are also currently held by Barisan Nasional.

See also
 Kingdom of Reman

References

Hulu Perak District
Mukims of Perak